The First Kangaroos is a 1988 British–Australian made for TV sports film directed by Frank Cvitanovich and starring Dennis Waterman, Chris Haywood and Dominic Sweeney. It depicts the 1908–09 Kangaroo tour of Great Britain, the first-ever such tour by the Australia national rugby league team.

The First Kangaroos drew complaints from the granddaughter of British rugby league legend Albert Goldthorpe for its villainous depiction of him.

Some scenes featured the grandstand of Arlington Oval in the inner-western Sydney suburb Dulwich Hill which hosted women's competitions of the 1938 British Empire Games.

Cast
 Dennis Waterman ... Albert Goldthorpe
 Chris Haywood ... James Joseph "J J" Giltinan
 Dominic Sweeney ... Herbert Henry "Dally" Messenger 
 Philip Quast ... Alex "Bluey" Burdon 
 Tony Martin ... Dan Frawley 
 Clarissa Kaye-Mason ... Mrs. Messenger 
 Jim Carter ... Arthur Hughes
 Alex Broun ... Morton 
 Wayne Pygram ... Albie Rosenfeld
 John Dicks ... Reverend Green 
 Nell Schofield ... Betty 
 Kelly Dingwall ... Jim Devereaux
 Robert Giltinan ... Reporter 
 Harold Kissin ... Trainer 
 Allan Surtees ... George the Barman
 Wayne Pearce ... Sid "Sandy" Pearce
 Andrew Ettingshausen ... Conlon

Both Wayne Pearce (Balmain Tigers) and Andrew Ettingshausen (Cronulla-Sutherland Sharks) were current Australian rugby league test players when the film was released. Pearce had been a member of the undefeated 1982 Kangaroo tour, while Ettingshausen would go on to be the leading try scorer on both the 1990 and 1994 Kangaroo Tours.

Reception
Karen Hardy, reviewing the film in 2013 said, "Sure, it wasn't the finest sports movie ever made but there was humour – intentional or not, I wasn't quite sure – and conflict and pathos. And its story, which it admitted in the opening credits was sort of based on true events, was an interesting one."

References

External links

The First Kangaroos at Oz Movies

1988 television films
1988 films
Australian drama television films
Rugby league films
Australian sports drama films
British sports drama films
Cultural depictions of Australian men
Cultural depictions of rugby footballers
1980s English-language films
1980s British films
British drama television films